Rev Matthew Black  (3 September 1908, Kilmarnock – 2 October 1994, St Andrews) was a Scottish minister and biblical scholar. He was the first editor of the journal, New Testament Studies.

Life
He was born in Kilmarnock the son of James Black. He attended Kilmarnock Academy.

After earning an M.A. and B.D. in Old Testament at the University of Glasgow, Black then studied at the University of Bonn and returned to the University of Glasgow for his D.Litt.

From 1942 to 1947 he was minister of Dunbarney.

From 1952 to 1954 he was Professor of Biblical Criticism and Antiquities at Edinburgh University and from 1954 to 1978 Professor of Divinity and Biblical Criticism at St Andrews University.

In 1968 he was President of the Society of Old Testament Studies.

He died in St Andrews in Fife.

New Testament work
Together with Kurt Aland, Carlo Maria Martini, Bruce M. Metzger and Allen Wikgren, Black served on the editorial committee that established the Greek text and critical apparatuses in the standard hand editions of the Greek New Testament: the Nestle-Aland Novum Testamentum Graece (26th edition, published by the Deutsche Bibelgesellschaft first in 1979 and revised in 1983) and the United Bible Societies' The Greek New Testament (3rd edition, published by the United Bible Societies in 1983).

Family
He married Ethel M. Hall in 1938.

Works

Books

Edited by

See also
 Aramaic New Testament

References

1908 births
1994 deaths
People from Kilmarnock
People educated at Kilmarnock Academy
Alumni of the University of Glasgow
University of Bonn alumni
20th-century Ministers of the Church of Scotland
Academics of the University of Edinburgh
Academics of the University of St Andrews
Fellows of the Royal Society of Edinburgh
Fellows of the British Academy
Old Testament scholars
New Testament scholars
Members of the Royal Swedish Academy of Sciences
British biblical scholars
Presidents of the Society for Old Testament Study